William Fearns (1 January 1867 – 1922) was a Scottish footballer who played in the Football League for Stoke.

Career
Fearns was born in Glasgow and played for the famous London amateur club, Corinthian. In 1896–97 He joined Stoke and played four matches for the "Potters" before returning to Corinthian.

Career statistics

References

Scottish footballers
Stoke City F.C. players
English Football League players
1867 births
1922 deaths
Association football defenders